Calgary Courts Centre is the largest court facility in Canada, and is located in Calgary, Alberta. It was constructed by the Government of Alberta and provides over 1 million square feet (90,000 m²) of court and office space.

History
Construction began in late 2004, and is now complete. Development of the east block began in the Fall of 2007. It included a 700-stall underground parkade, an urban park, and the demolition of the Court of Queen's Bench facility.

The prime consultant for the building was Kasian Architecture and Interior Design Ltd working collaboratively with design architect Carlos Ott and is built by the Cana construction company with the security system being installed by Convergint Technologies. The structural engineering was provided by Stantec. On completion, the north tower's 24 floors will stand 129 m (423 ft) high. The project had a budget of 300 million dollars and hosts 73 courtrooms, judicial chambers, and facilities for 180 security personnel and approximately 360 government, library and external agencies staff.

See also 
 List of tallest buildings in Calgary

References

Buildings and structures in Calgary
Carlos Ott buildings
Courthouses in Canada
Alberta government buildings
Public–private partnership projects in Canada